is a Japanese football player.He Currently play for Tiamo Hirakata from 2023.

Career
Shota Fujisaki joined J3 League club Fujieda MYFC in 2016.

From the 2019 season he joined Kochi United SC of the Shikoku Soccer League.

In 2022, he joined to JFL club, Tiamo Hirakata for upcoming 2023 season.

References

External links

1994 births
Living people
Shobi University alumni
Association football people from Tokyo
Japanese footballers
J3 League players
Japan Football League players
Fujieda MYFC players
Kochi United SC players
FC Tiamo Hirakata players
Association football defenders